New Castle County is the northernmost of the three counties of the U.S. state of Delaware (New Castle, Kent, and Sussex). As of the 2020 census, the population was 570,719, making it the most populous county in Delaware, with nearly 60% of the state's population of 989,948. The county seat is Wilmington, which is also the state's most populous city.

New Castle County is included in the Philadelphia-Camden-Wilmington, PA-NJ-DE-MD Metropolitan Statistical Area. The county is named after William Cavendish, 1st Duke of Newcastle (–1676).

New Castle County has the highest population and population density of any Delaware county, and it is the smallest county in the state by area. It has more people than the other two counties, Kent and Sussex, combined.  It is also the most economically developed of the three.

History
The first permanent European settlement on Delaware soil was Fort Christina, resulting from Peter Minuit's 1638 expedition on the Swedish vessels Fogel Grip and Kalmar Nyckel. The Swedes laid out the town at the site of modern-day Wilmington. They contracted with the Lenape Native Americans for land of Old Cape Henlopen north to Sankikans (Trenton Falls), and inland as far as they desired. However, a dispute ensued between the Swedes and the Dutch, who asserted a prior claim to that land.

In 1640, New Sweden was founded a few miles south of Christina. In 1644, Queen Christina appointed Lt. Col. Johan Printz as Governor of New Sweden. She directed boundaries to be set and to reach Cape Henlopen north along the west side of Godyn's Bay (Delaware Bay), up the South River (Delaware River), past Minquas Kill (Christina River), to Sankikans (Trenton Falls). Printz settled on Tinicum Island, as the seat of government and capital of the New Sweden colony.

Peter Stuyvesant, Governor of New Netherland, sailed up the South River in 1651. He purchased land from the Lenape that covered Minquas Kill to Bompties Hook (Bombay Hook); the Lenape had sold part of the property to the Swedes in 1638. Stuyvesant began to build Fort Casimir (contemporary New Castle).

In 1654, Johan Risingh, commissary and councilor to the Governor Lt. Col. Printz, officially assumed Printz's duties and began to expel all Dutch from New Sweden. Fort Casimir surrendered and was renamed Fort Trinity in 1654. The Swedes had complete possession of the west side of the Delaware River. On June 21, 1654, the Lenape met with the Swedes to reaffirm the purchase.

Having learned of the fall of Fort Casimir, the Dutch sent Stuyvesant to drive the Swedes from both sides of the river. They allowed only Dutch colonists to settle in the area and on August 31, 1655, the territory was converted back to Fort Casimir. Consequently, Fort Christina fell on September 15 to the Dutch, was renamed Fort Altena and New Netherland ruled once again. John Paul Jacquet was immediately appointed governor, making New Amstel the capital of the Dutch-controlled colony.

As payment for regaining the territory, the Dutch West India Company conveyed land from the south side of Christina Kill to Bombay Hook, and as far west as Minquas land. This land was known as the Colony of The City. On December 22, 1663, the Dutch transferred property rights to the territory along the Delaware River to England.

In 1664, the Duke of York, James, was granted this land by King Charles II. One of the first acts by the Duke was to order removal of all Dutch from New Amsterdam; he renamed New Amstel as New Castle. In 1672, the town of New Castle was incorporated and English law ordered. However, in 1673, the Dutch attacked the territory, reclaiming it for their own.

On September 12, 1673, the Dutch established New Amstel in present-day Delaware, fairly coterminous with today's New Castle County. The establishment was not stable, and it was transferred to the British under the Treaty of Westminster on February 9, 1674.  On November 6, 1674, New Amstel was made dependent on New York Colony, and was renamed New Castle on November 11, 1674.

On September 22, 1676, New Castle County was formally placed under the Duke of York's laws. It gained land from Upland County on November 12, 1678.

On June 21, 1680, St. Jones County was carved from New Castle County. It is known today as Kent County, Delaware.  On August 24, 1682, New Castle County, along with the rest of the surrounding land, was transferred from the Colony of New York to the possession of William Penn, who established the Colony of Delaware.

In September 1673, a Dutch council established a court at New Castle with the boundaries defined as north of Steen Kill (present-day Stoney Creek) and south to Bomties Hook (renamed Bombay Hook). In 1681, a 12-mile arc was drawn to specifically delineate the northern border of New Castle County as it currently exists. In 1685, the western border was finally established by King James II; this was set as a line from Old Cape Henlopen (presently Fenwick) west to the middle of the peninsula and north up to the middle of the peninsula to the 40th parallel.

Geography

The boundaries of New Castle County are described in § 102 of the Delaware Code. The county is drained by Brandywine Creek, Christina River, and other channels. Its eastern edge sits along the Delaware River and Delaware Bay.

Two small exclaves of the county and the state lie across the Delaware River, on its east bank on the New Jersey side, Finns Point  adjacent to Pennsville Township, New Jersey, and the northern tip of Artificial Island, adjacent to Lower Alloways Creek Township, New Jersey.

New Castle County, like all of Delaware's counties, is subdivided into hundreds. New Castle County is apportioned into eleven hundreds: Brandywine, Christiana, Wilmington (the city of Wilmington, which, by law, is a hundred in itself), Mill Creek, White Clay Creek, Pencader, New Castle, Red Lion, St. Georges, Appoquinimink, and Blackbird.

The Chesapeake and Delaware Canal was built through New Castle County, and adjoining Cecil County, Maryland, between 1822 and 1829.

Adjacent counties
 Chester County, Pennsylvania – northwest
 Delaware County, Pennsylvania – north
 Gloucester County, New Jersey – northeast
 Salem County, New Jersey – east
 Kent County, Delaware – south
 Kent County, Maryland – southwest
 Cecil County, Maryland – west

Major roads and highways

Climate
Almost all of the county has a humid subtropical climate (Cfa) except in a small area of higher lands in the NW where the climate is (like neighboring southern Chester County, Pennsylvania) hot-summer humid continental (Dfa.) The hardiness zones are 7a and 7b. The freezing-point January isotherm is in the NW corner. Two to three months average above 22 °C (71.6 °F) and seven months average above 10 °C (50 °F.) The hardiness zone is mostly 7a except along the Delaware River from central Wilmington upstream where it is 7b.

Demographics

2000 census
As of the census of 2000, there were 500,265 people, 188,935 households, and 127,153 families residing in the county. The racial makeup of the county was 73.12% White, 20.22% Black or African American, 0.20% Native American, 2.59% Asian, 0.03% Pacific Islander, 2.22% from other races, and 1.62% from two or more races. 5.26% of the population were Hispanic or Latino of any race. 14.6% were of Irish, 11.4% Italian, 10.9% German, 8.8% English and 5.4% Polish ancestry. 89.5% spoke English and 5.3% Spanish as their first language.

There were 188,935 households, out of which 32.50% had children under the age of 18 living with them, 49.60% were married couples living together, 13.40% had a female householder with no husband present, and 32.70% were non-families. 25.70% of all households were made up of individuals, and 8.50% had someone living alone who was 65 years of age or older. The average household size was 2.56 and the average family size was 3.09.

In the county, the population was spread out, with 24.90% under the age of 18, 10.30% from 18 to 24, 31.50% from 25 to 44, 21.70% from 45 to 64, and 11.60% who were 65 years of age or older. The median age was 35 years. For every 100 females there were 94.40 males. For every 100 females age 18 and over, there were 90.80 males.

The median income for a household in the county was $52,419, and the median income for a family was $62,144. Males had a median income of $42,541 versus $31,829 for females. The per capita income for the county was $25,413. 8.40% of the population and 5.60% of families were below the poverty line. Out of the total population, 10.20% of those under the age of 18 and 7.40% of those 65 and older were living below the poverty line.

2010 census
As of the 2010 census, there were 538,479 people, 202,651 households, and 134,743 families residing in the county. The racial makeup of the county was 65.5% white, 23.7% black or African American, 4.3% Asian, 0.3% American Indian, 3.5% from other races, and 2.5% from two or more races. Those of Hispanic or Latino origin made up 8.7% of the population. In terms of ancestry, 19.2% were Irish, 15.0% were German, 11.7% were Italian, 11.3% were English, 6.2% were Polish, and 3.0% were American.

Of the 202,651 households, 33.8% had children under the age of 18 living with them, 46.6% were married couples living together, 14.9% had a female householder with no husband present, 33.5% were non-families, and 26.1% of all households were made up of individuals. The average household size was 2.57 and the average family size was 3.11. The median age was 37.2 years.

The median income for a household in the county was $62,474 and the median income for a family was $78,072. Males had a median income of $52,637 versus $41,693 for females. The per capita income for the county was $31,220. About 6.6% of families and 10.3% of the population were below the poverty line, including 13.6% of those under age 18 and 7.6% of those age 65 or over.

Government

County government

County executive
The county is headed by a County Executive, currently Matthew S. Meyer. The Chief Administrative Officer, who is the county's second-in-command, is appointed by the County Executive and serves at his or her pleasure. Vanessa S. Phillips was appointed CAO in March 2018.

County Council

The county's legislative body is a thirteen-member county council, consisting of twelve members elected by district and one president elected at large. The council is tasked with drafting laws and managing county government services, public health ordinances, land use, transportation, and zoning.  New Castle County Council doubled in size to thirteen from seven members in 2004. Its most famous council member was Joe Biden, the 46th and current President of the United States, who represented the 4th district from 1971 to 1973.

Current county council members are:
 District 1: Kenneth Woods (D)
 District 2: Dee Durham (D)
 District 3: Janet Kilpatrick (R)
 District 4: Penrose Hollins (D)
 District 5: Lisa Diller (D)
 District 6: David Carter (D)
 District 7: George Smiley (D)
 District 8: John J. Cartier (D)
 District 9: Timothy P. Sheldon (D)
 District 10: Jea P. Street (D)
 District 11: David L. Tackett (D)
 District 12: Bill Bell (D)
 At Large: Karen Hartley-Nagle (D), President

County judiciary
As with Delaware's other two counties, New Castle County has no judiciary of its own. All judicial functions, except for Alderman's Courts, are managed and funded by the state of Delaware.  In New Castle County, only the cities of Newport and Newark have Alderman's Courts. These Courts have jurisdiction over driving offenses, misdemeanor criminal charges, and minor civil claims.

County row offices
The county retains the concept of "row offices" from Pennsylvania, so-called because all of these county offices could be found in a row in smaller courthouses. In Delaware, these offices are Clerk of the Peace, Recorder of Deeds, Register of Wills and Sheriff.

The office of Clerk of the Peace is unique among the 50 states; the office-holder's function is almost exclusively to perform marriages. The current incumbent is Kenneth W. Boulden, Jr. (D)

The Recorder of Deeds is Michael Kozikowski (D). His office is responsible for receiving and recording deeds, mortgages and satisfactions thereof, assignments, commissions of judges, notaries, and military officers. The Recorder of Deeds' office is heavily computerized; electronic images of all recent documents and many others are available the office is in the process of imaging further back with the eventual goal of all documents in the office's possession being available electronically. Computerized indexing and searching is also available.

The Register of Wills is Ciro Poppiti, III. His office receives and records wills and small-estate affidavits upon an individual's death, and issues letters of administration to estate executors.

The Sheriff of New Castle County has two divisions, criminal and civil. The criminal division is based in the New Castle County Courthouse in Wilmington. The deputies assigned to this division organize and manage capias returns. They also transport prisoners for Superior Court, Court of Common Pleas, and Family Court.  The civil division serves legal process, performs levies & impounds and sells property in satisfaction of judgments. The civil division also locates and apprehends individuals wanted for civil capias. The current Sheriff is Scott T. Phillips.

County zoning and public works
New Castle County has a strong zoning code, known as the Unified Development Code, or UDC. The UDC was developed by the Gordon Administration in response to public perception of over- and misdevelopment in the county. New building projects must go through a process of application and approval before construction is permitted to begin.

By operation of state law, New Castle County has no responsibility whatsoever for maintenance of roadways. Public roadways are maintained exclusively by the Delaware Department of Transportation, while roadways within neighborhoods and developments are, pursuant to County code, maintained by homeowners' or neighborhood associations.

The Department of Public Works maintains essential infrastructure elements such as sanitary sewers and drainage ways.  It also maintains County-owned parks and buildings such as County libraries.  It does not maintain the water distribution system, which is owned and operated by several private companies.  In general, it also does not maintain stormwater management facilities within subdivisions.

County public safety
Access to 911 emergency services is provided by New Castle County through their emergency communications center for all fire/rescue/emergency medical services (EMS) throughout the county and the majority of police services, though Newark, Wilmington, and the University of Delaware maintain their own police emergency call centers.  New Castle County has its own nationally accredited police department. The New Castle County Police Department is the second largest police organization in the state of Delaware. New Castle County maintains a county wide police force with authorization to enforce laws throughout the county, including within incorporated municipalities. The county police force is supported by local municipality police agencies in Middletown, Newark, Delaware City, Wilmington, Newport, Elsmere, the city of New Castle, the University of Delaware, as well as the Delaware State Police.

New Castle County also operates a nationally accredited, county-run paramedic service through its Emergency Medical Services Division. NCC*EMS is the advanced life support (ALS) component of a two-tiered, paramedic intercept EMS system. County paramedics are located in eight full-time stations and one part-time station that operates during the hours of 7:00 a.m. to 7:00 p.m., with a capability of calling in additional personnel during major emergencies or planned events. Basic life support (BLS) ambulance service is provided primarily by volunteer fire companies with the use of paid employees that are trained in fire suppression and EMS. Fire/Rescue protection is provided by twenty-one volunteer fire departments throughout the county. The city of Wilmington has its own career municipal fire department and contracts with a private ambulance service for basic life support coverage. The contracted private ambulance service in Wilmington operates in a tiered response configuration with the New Castle County Paramedics.

The Paul J. Sweeney Public Safety Building, located in Minquadale off of US 13, houses the New Castle County Police and Emergency Medical Services Division Headquarters and the emergency communications center supporting 9-1-1 services. The Headquarters occupied a former elementary school building on the same site prior to erection of the current building.

Federal government
New Castle nowadays is a strongly Democratic county. Because its population is almost double the combined population of Kent and Sussex, the winner in New Castle County has also won Delaware overall in each of the last seventeen presidential elections. In 1992, 2000, 2004 and 2016, the Republican candidate carried Kent and Sussex, only to lose New Castle by double digits–enough of a margin to swing the entire state to the Democrats. New Castle was a bellwether from 1936 to 1996, as it backed the national winner in every presidential election. Notably former Governor Ronald Reagan won the county by just one vote over President Jimmy Carter in 1980. This changed when Al Gore won the county in 2000 and, like many urban counties, New Castle stayed Democratic ever since.
 The county warmly supported former Senator and Wilmington resident Joe Biden as Barack Obama's running mate in 2008 and 2012, and during his own bid for president in 2020, each time with well over 65 percent of the vote–more than enough to carry Delaware.

|}

State government
The Delaware Department of Services for Children, Youth, and Their Families (DSCYF) has its headquarters in the Delaware Youth and Family Center (DYFC), located in unincorporated New Castle County, near Wilmington. Several DSCYF juvenile facilities, including the New Castle County Detention Center (NCCDC), the Ferris School for Boys, and the Grace and Snowden Cottages are in unincorporated New Castle County.

Several Delaware Department of Correction facilities are located in the county. The James T. Vaughn Correctional Center (JTVCC), formerly the Delaware Correctional Center, is a men's prison in unincorporated New Castle County, housing sentenced prisoners; Vaughn opened in 1971. The Howard R. Young Correctional Institution, renamed from Multi-Purpose Criminal Justice Facility in 2004 and housing both pretrial and posttrial male prisoners, is located in Wilmington; it opened in 1982. The Delores J. Baylor Correctional Institution, a women's prison housing pretrial and posttrial prisoners, is located in unincorporated New Castle County. Baylor opened on December 29, 1991. The Delaware male death row is in the JTVCC, while the female death row is in Baylor. Executions occur at JTVCC.

New Castle elects a substantial majority of the state legislature, with 27 state house districts and 17 state senate districts based in the county.

Communities
New Castle County is home to two minor league sports teams: the Wilmington Blue Rocks (baseball) and the Delaware Blue Coats (basketball), both of which play in Wilmington. It also has a professional auto racing track in New Castle known as Airport Speedway, with races on Saturday nights throughout the summer.

Cities
 Delaware City
 New Castle
 Newark
 Wilmington

Towns

 Bellefonte
 Clayton (partly in Kent County)
 Elsmere
 Middletown
 Newport
 Odessa
 Smyrna (partly in Kent County)
 Townsend

Villages
 Arden
 Ardencroft
 Ardentown

Census-designated places

 Talleyville
 Bear
 Brookside
 Claymont
 Edgemoor
 Glasgow
 Greenville
 Hockessin
 North Star
 Pike Creek
 Pike Creek Valley
 St. Georges
 Wilmington Manor

Unincorporated communities

 Appoquinimink Hundred
 Alapocas
 Centerville
 Christiana
 Collins Park
 Granogue
 Holly Oak
 Marshallton
 Mill Creek
 Minquadale
 Montchanin
 Mount Pleasant
 Ogletown
 Port Penn
 Rockland
 Stanton
 Wooddale

Education
 School districts
 Appoquinimink School District
 Brandywine School District
 Christina School District
 Colonial School District
 Red Clay Consolidated School District
 Smyrna School District
County-wide overlay district: New Castle County Vocational-Technical School District

 State-operated schools
 Delaware School for the Deaf

 Tertiary
 Delaware College of Art & Design
 Delaware State University – Wilmington Campus
 Delaware Technical & Community College – Wilmington Campus
 Goldey-Beacom College
 University of Delaware – Main Campus, Wilmington Campus and Downtown Building
 Wilmington University – Wilmington Campus
 Widener University Delaware Law School

See also

 National Register of Historic Places listings in New Castle County, Delaware
 Morris Branch (Corks Point Ditch tributary)
 Hindu Temple of Delaware

References

External links
 
 Delaware Map Data

 
Delaware counties
1637 establishments in North America
Populated places established in 1637
17th-century establishments in New Sweden
1637 establishments in the Swedish colonial empire